Monocephalus is a genus of dwarf spiders that was first described by F. P. Smith in 1906.

Species
 it contains two species:
Monocephalus castaneipes (Simon, 1884) – Europe
Monocephalus fuscipes (Blackwall, 1836) (type) – Europe

See also
 List of Linyphiidae species (I–P)

References

Araneomorphae genera
Linyphiidae